Imakulata Malinka (21 February 1935 – 23 August 2019) was a Croatian organist, nun, music pedagogue, choirmaster and church musician, longstanding organist of the Zagreb cathedral. She is an author of several scientific papers known for their efforts to respect, reconcile and combine Gregorian chant and classic polyphonical traditions with popular ecclesiastical music (folk songs).

She was born as a sixth child in the family of Rudolf and Marija (née Kovačević) in Nova Gradiška and baptized as Bernardica. On 25 August 1951 she entered the monastery of the Our Lady's nuns in Zagreb, where she studied organs and musical theory at the Academy of Music in Zagreb (1960–65), under the mentorship of Vlasta Hranilović. Furthermore, she educated at the Papal Institute of sacral music in Regensburg (1967) as well as lectured piano, organ and musical theory at the Institute for church music "Albe Vidaković" in Zagreb for thirty-one years (1968–99). She performed in St. Gallen, Überlingen, Regensburg und Weingarten.

In the collaboration with Željko Petrač in 1972 Malinka established Collegium pro musica sacra, that in 1996 won silver medal at the International church choirs competition "Perluigi da Palestrina" in Jerusalem. Under her guidance Collegium held more than a thousand concerts, not only in Croatia but also internationally.

Bibliography
 "Naši pjevački zborovi - Sveta glazba u redovničkim novicijatima" Sacred Cecilia: a sacred music magazine 39 (1), 1969, 24.
 "Naši pjevački zborovi - Glazba u redovničkim novicijatima" Sacred Cecilia 39 (2), 1969, 60.
 "Naš glazbeni život: Franjo Dugan i Oskar Sigmund", Sacred Cecilia 40 (4), 1970, 125-126.
 "In memoriam: Franjo Lučić", Sacred Cecilia 42 (1), 1972, 2.
 "Vijesti iz inozemstva: Gloria Deo - Pax hominibus Slava Bogu - mir ljudima", Sacred Cecilia 45 (1), 1975, 27.
 "Iz naših župa: Kolaudicija novih orgulja u samostanu sestara dominikanki na Korčuli; Prigodni koncert uz kolaudaciju orgulja 15. svibnja 1979. u samostanu ss. dominikanki na Korčuli", Sacred Cecilia 49 (4), 1979, 116-117.
 "Obljetnice: Oskar Sigmund", Sacred Cecilia 50 (4), 1980, 102.
 "Iz naših župa: Sretno uskrsnuće prekrasnih orgulja u Čazmi", Sacred Cecilia 53 (3), 1983, 65.
 "Iz naših župa: Čovjek koji je udario pečat vjere u srce svoga naroda", Sacred Cecilia 53 (4), 1983, 93-94.
 "Reproduktivni problemi u opusu Ivana Marka Lukačića", in: Maračić, Ljudevit: Lukačić - Zbornik radova znanstvenog skupa održanog u povodu 400. obljetnice rođenja Ivana Marka Lukačića (1585-1985),  Provincijalat franjevaca konventualaca: Zagreb, 1987.
 "Štovanje Bogorodice pomoću ansambla Collegium pro musica sacra", Sacred Cecilia 63 (1-2), 1993, 209-218.

References 

1935 births
2019 deaths
People from Nova Gradiška
Croatian nuns
Croatian organists
Academy of Music, University of Zagreb alumni
Burials at Miroševac Cemetery